The Van Pelt is an American indie rock band from New York City that were active from 1993 to 1997, and have reformed briefly several times since then.

The band formed in 1993 at New York University, with Chris Leo (formerly of Native Nod and brother of Ted Leo) on vocals and guitar, David Baum on guitar,  Barry London on bass, and Neil O'Brien on drums. A seven song demo was recorded with Geoff Turner at WGNS studio in DC, and a split single with Radio to Saturn featuring "His Saxophone Is My Guitar" was released on Sudden Shame records. London soon left the group, and Toko Yasuda joined the band in 1995 to record their first album Stealing From Our Favorite Thieves in 1996 with Alap Momin at Sweetwood Sound. Baum & Yasuda would leave the group within the year, Yasuda joining Blonde Redhead. Brian Maryansky & Sean Greene would join late 96 for writing, recording of and Sultans Of Sentiment in 1997.  "Sultans" & "Thieves" were released by Gern Blandsten records. Greene would soon leave the band & Toko Yasuda returned to tour & record the Speeding Train ep on Art Monk Construction Records.

The Van Pelt disbanded in 1997, with Chris and Toko forming a new band called the Lapse that year, and Brian later joining the band Jets to Brazil in 1998.

The band reunited in 2009 for two shows, playing one show on June 20 at the Blackcat in Washington, D.C. with Frodus, and another on June 21 at Kung Fu Necktie in Philadelphia, Pennsylvania.

In February 2014, it was announced that the band would be issuing a record of previous unreleased material recorded around 1996 and 1997, as well as reforming to play at the All Tomorrow's Parties Jabberwocky festival in London. The album, Imaginary Third, was released in April 2014.

On December 6, 2022, the band announced via Instagram that a fourth studio album, entitled Artisans & Merchants, would be released in March 2023. This album marks the first new recordings by the band since the 1990s. The record will be released by Spartan Records in North America, Gringo Records in the UK and La Castanya in Europe and the rest of the world. The first single from the album, Punk House, was released on January 20, 2023, alongside worldwide pre-orders for the new album.

Discography

Albums
 Stealing From Our Favorite Thieves (1996)
 Sultans Of Sentiment (1997)
 Imaginary Third (2014, La Castanya)
 Tramonto - Live in Ferrara 12.08.2014 (2016, Gringo Records / Flying Kid)
 Artisans & Merchants (2023, Spartan Records / Gringo Records / La Castanya)

EPs
 Split 7" with Radio To Saturn (1994)
 Split 7" with Young Pioneers (1995)
 Split 7" with Chisel
 Speeding Train (EP, Art Monk Construction, 1997)
 Same As Stone 7" (2005)

References

External links
Gern Blandsten
Southern Records
Gringo Records

Indie rock musical groups from New York (state)
Musical groups from New York City
American art rock groups
American post-hardcore musical groups
American emo musical groups